Fernow Experimental Forest is a research forest in Tucker County, West Virginia.  It is operated by the U.S. Forest Service's Northern Research Station. It is named for Bernhard Fernow, a prominent forester in the late 19th century and early 20th century.

History
The area that now makes up Fernow was heavily logged between 1905 and 1911. In 1934, the drainage basin of Elklick Run in Monongahela National Forest was set aside to create the current research forest.

In the beginning, foresters studied high-elevation red spruce and the impact of fire on hardwood forests.  The forest was closed during World War II but reopened in 1948 to study forest and watershed management in the central Appalachians.

See also
Monongahela National Forest

References

External links
US Forest Service: Northern Research Station - Fernow Experimental Forest

Monongahela National Forest
Protected areas of Tucker County, West Virginia
National Forests of West Virginia
Research forests